National Highway 353B, or NH-353B is a national highway in  India. It is a spur road of National Highway 53. It traverses the states of Maharashtra and Telangana in India.

Route 

 Maharashtra

Ashti, Gondpimpri, Rajura, Bamawada, Gadchandur, Vansadi, Korpana - Telangana border.

 Telangana

Maharashtra border - Bela, Jainad, Adilabad.

Junctions  

  Terminal near Ashti.
  Rajura
  Terminal near Adilabad.

Project development 
The 56.6 km section from Rajura to Maharashtra border is being widened to 4/6 lane at an estimated cost of  ₹ 647.99 crores.

See also 

 List of National Highways in India
 List of National Highways in India by state

References

External links 

 NH 353B on OpenStreetMap

National highways in India
National Highways in Maharashtra
National Highways in Telangana